Busboy Productions is a production company that was launched by Jon Stewart in the mid-1990s when he was known for hosting The Jon Stewart Show on MTV. In addition to Stewart, executive Chris McShane is in charge of development and production.

Name
The name of the company is a reference to how Stewart worked as a busboy in a Mexican restaurant as a young man. The company's vanity card features the sound of a glass being knocked over followed by Jon Stewart whispering "Oops. Sorry."

History
Shortly after The Jon Stewart Show was canceled, Stewart signed a production deal with Miramax to star in at least two films per year and develop his own projects. However, Stewart starred in only three films for Miramax and no projects were ever produced.

After Stewart's success as host and producer of The Daily Show, Busboy Productions was revived. In 2002, Stewart approached NBC to create a show in which Stephen Colbert would star. That show never got off the ground.

In 2005, Busboy Productions reached an agreement with Comedy Central to finance the production company. Comedy Central has a first-look agreement of any project. If Comedy Central passes on a project, Busboy is free to shop them to other networks. More recently, Busboy and Apple received a first look deal.

Projects

The Colbert Report

Busboy's first television production was The Colbert Report, produced by Stewart, Stephen Colbert, and Ben Karlin, and subject to a distribution agreement between Busboy Productions and Comedy Central, which made certain that "the Report" would run through 2007. The Colbert Report was produced in association with Stephen Colbert's Spartina Productions.

Jon Stewart joked in an interview with E!, when asked if he would appear on the Report, that he "doesn't do start-ups" and would wait until the show set into a deeper footing. He has since made several appearances.

Colbert's response was that "His shadow is dark enough. I don't want to ask the source of darkness for help. I'm not interested in that same liberal claptrap. That meow, meow, meow, ironic detachment.  We're going to deal with truth on my show."

While The Colbert Report is Busboy Production's first successful television show, the notice "Copyright (c) 2004 by Busboy Productions, Inc. All Rights Reserved" appeared at the bottom of the "Shadow Government" poster included in The Daily Show's America (The Book).

Important Things with Demetri Martin

Busboy Productions also launched Important Things with Demetri Martin, a comedy show starring Demetri Martin, in which he "alternates between taped sketches and stand-up performances in front of a studio audience". Jon Stewart took an active role in "shepherding" the pilot. Reuters reports:

The Naturalized
The Naturalized is a documentary film about immigrants from different countries seeking citizenship. It aired on History December 14, 2010.

The Rally to Restore Sanity and/or Fear

Rumble 2012
Official title: "O'Reilly v Stewart 2012: The Rumble in the Air-Conditioned Auditorium."

On October 6, 2012, Stewart and Bill O'Reilly met at the Lisner Auditorium at George Washington University for a debate that was not broadcast on television but live-streamed. The promotion tagline was "It's why Al Gore invented the Internet." The show was marked by technical difficulties—many people were unable to access the live-stream—but was touted for being substantive. The event was a joint venture between Busboy and O'Reilly's Straight Talk. Web services were provided by Nox Solutions.

Sportsfan
Sportsfan is a documentary film which follows a group of Minnesota Vikings fans throughout the football season. It aired on SpikeTV in 2006.

Three Strikes

Three Strikes was the first scripted comedy pilot under Comedy Central's first look deal with Busboy.  While a pilot episode was filmed, the series was not picked up by Comedy Central.

The project was a character-based comedy set in the world of minor league baseball. It was written by Alex Gregory and Peter Huyck, whose credits include King of the Hill, Frasier, The Larry Sanders Show and the Late Show with David Letterman.

Rosewater

Rosewater is an American drama film written and directed by Stewart, based on the memoir Then They Came for Me by Maziar Bahari and Aimee Molloy.

The Nightly Show with Larry Wilmore

On May 9, 2014, it was announced that Larry Wilmore from The Daily Show was selected to host a late-night talk show on Comedy Central, to replace The Colbert Report following Stephen Colbert's departure from the network to host Late Show with Stephen Colbert on CBS. The show is titled The Nightly Show with Larry Wilmore and is produced by Busboy Productions. It premiered on January 19, 2015, and ran Mondays through Thursdays at 11:30 PM (EST) following The Daily Show until its cancellation on August 18, 2016.

The Problem with Jon Stewart

The Problem with Jon Stewart is a late night-style current affairs streaming television series hosted by Stewart on Apple TV+. Each episode is accompanied by a companion podcast (also produced by Busboy Productions) which includes further discussion on the episode's topic, featuring Stewart, his staff, and guests from the episode.

References

 
Companies based in New York City
Film production companies of the United States
Mass media companies established in 1998
Television production companies of the United States